Mauritius competed at the 1996 Summer Olympics in Atlanta, United States.

Results and competitors by event

Athletics

Men 

Track and road events

Field events

Badminton 

Men

Women

Mixed

Boxing

Judo 

Men

Women

Swimming 

Men

Women

Weightlifting

References
sports-reference
Official Olympic Reports

Nations at the 1996 Summer Olympics
1996
OLy